Dariusz Szczerbal (born 2 November 1995) is a Polish professional footballer who plays as a goalkeeper for III liga club Polonia Nysa.

Senior career

Szczerbal's career started with Polonia Leszno, with whom he started with the youth team before advancing to the first team in 2013. In 2016 Szczerbal joined Piast Żmigród, where he played 55 times over two seasons. At the beginning of 2018 Szczerbal joined Śląsk Wrocław.

References

1995 births
People from Leszno
Polish footballers
Living people
Association football goalkeepers
Śląsk Wrocław players
Elana Toruń players
GKS Bełchatów players
Arka Gdynia players
II liga players
III liga players